Hope Munro (née Brown; born 14 June 1981, in Toowoomba, Queensland) is a field hockey midfielder from Australia, who played for the Australian women's national team, the Hockeyroos at the 2008 Summer Olympics in Beijing and 2012 Summer Olympics in London. Munro lives in Perth, Western Australia with her husband and children. Her younger brother Kiel Brown plays for the Australian men's team, the Kookaburras.

References

External links
 

1981 births
Living people
Australian female field hockey players
Olympic field hockey players of Australia
Field hockey players at the 2008 Summer Olympics
Field hockey players at the 2012 Summer Olympics